Ren Bishi is a Chinese television series directed by Wang Baohua and starring Wang Jian, Wu Shanshan, Gu Yue, Sun Xiangyu, Wang Wufu, Guo Faceng.

Plot summary
The series focuses on Ren Bishi's life from the mid-1920s to his death in 1950, documenting his development and achievements as a communist revolutionary.

Actors

Theme Song 
 The theme song "Bishi's Song" was sung by Huang Qiwen.

Background 
The series was produced in commemoration of Ren's 100th birthday.

Controversies 
In 2011, Ren Bishi's grandson Ren Xuning filed a lawsuit in Beijing against the series for infringing upon Ren Yuanyuan's (Bishi's son) name but was annulled as there were no resemblances to Ren Yuanyuan.

References 

2008 Chinese television series debuts
2008 Chinese television series endings
Chinese documentary television series
Chinese period television series
Television shows set in China